Reunited with Jimmy Webb 1974–1988 is a compilation album of Glen Campbell recordings of Jimmy Webb songs, released in 1999 by Raven Records. The album contains the complete album Reunion: The Songs of Jimmy Webb (1974) and the Webb compositions from Bloodline (1976), Southern Nights (1977), Highwayman (1979), It's the World Gone Crazy (1981), Still Within the Sound of My Voice (1987), and Light Years (1988).

Track listing
All songs written by Jimmy Webb, except where indicated.
 "Roll Me Easy" (Lowell George) – 2:41
 "Just This One Time" – 3:46
 "You Might as Well Smile" – 3:35
 "Wishing Now" – 3:16
 "About the Ocean" (Susan Webb) – 3:01
 "Ocean in His Eyes" – 3:27
 "The Moon's a Harsh Mistress" – 3:07
 "I Keep It Hid" – 3:27
 "Adoration" – 3:16
 "It's a Sin" – 2:24
 "Christian No" – 2:31
 "Early Morning Song" – 3:30
 "Highwayman" – 3:02
 "Love Song" – 3:15
 "In Cars" – 3:02
 "Still Within the Sound of My Voice" – 4:08
 "For Sure, for Certain, Forever, for Always" – 3:16
 "Lightning in a Bottle" – 4:04
 "If These Walls Could Speak" – 2:58
 "More Than Enough" – 2:53
 "Brand New Eyes" – 2:29
 "Light Years" – 3:47
 "Almost Alright Again" – 3:27
 "Our Movie" – 3:33

Production
 Producers – Jimmy Bowen, Dennis Lambert, Brian Potter, Gary Klein, Tom Thacker, Glen Campbell
 Collection compiled by Glenn A. Baker, John Dowler, Peter Shillito, Kevin Mueller
 Artwork – Greg Klein, Alan Duffy
 Photographs – The Glenn A. Baker Archives
 Made in Australia by Raven Records

References

1999 compilation albums
Albums produced by Jimmy Bowen
Glen Campbell compilation albums